The 1973 Houston Astros season was a season in American baseball. The team finished fourth in the National League West with a record of 82–80, 17 games behind the Cincinnati Reds.

Offseason 
 November 27, 1972: Rich Chiles and Buddy Harris were traded by the Astros to the New York Mets for Tommie Agee.
 January 10, 1973: Mike Stanton was drafted by the Astros in the 1st round (5th pick) of the 1973 Major League Baseball draft (Secondary Phase).

Regular season 
 June 19, 1973: Dave Winfield of the San Diego Padres made his major league debut against the Astros. Winfield had one hit in four at-bats.

Season standings

Record vs. opponents

Notable transactions 
 July 31, 1973: Jesús Alou was purchased from the Astros by the Oakland Athletics.
 August 18, 1973: Tommie Agee was traded by the Astros to the St. Louis Cardinals for Dave Campbell and cash.

Draft picks 
 June 5, 1973: 1973 Major League Baseball draft
Ken Landreaux was drafted by the Astros in the 8th round, but did not sign.
Mike Davey was drafted by the Astros in the 18th round, but did not sign.

Roster

Player stats

Batting

Starters by position 
Note: Pos = Position; G = Games played; AB = At bats; H = Hits; Avg. = Batting average; HR = Home runs; RBI = Runs batted in

Other batters 
Note: G = Games played; AB = At bats; H = Hits; Avg. = Batting average; HR = Home runs; RBI = Runs batted in

Pitching

Starting pitchers 
Note: G = Games pitched; IP = Innings pitched; W = Wins; L = Losses; ERA = Earned run average; SO = Strikeouts

Other pitchers 
Note: G = Games pitched; IP = Innings pitched; W = Wins; L = Losses; ERA = Earned run average; SO = Strikeouts

Relief pitchers 
Note: G = Games pitched; W = Wins; L = Losses; SV = Saves; ERA = Earned run average; SO = Strikeouts

Farm system

References

External links
1973 Houston Astros season at Baseball Reference

Houston Astros seasons
Houston Astros season
Houston Astro